Macclesfield Academy is an Academy situated in Macclesfield, Cheshire.

The Academy opened on 1 September 2011 following the decision of Cheshire East Council to close Macclesfield High School which had previously operated on the same site. It is built on the Macclesfield Learning Zone campus, sharing it with Macclesfield College, Park Lane Special School and various other facilities. Sponsored by Macclesfield College, the Academy is funded by a funding agreement with the Department for Education. The Academy has approximately 50 teachers and 30 support staff who together serve a population of about 650 students.

Ofsted judgements

As of 2021, the school's most recent inspection by Ofsted was in 2020, with a judgement of Requires Improvement.

References

Macclesfield
Academies in the Borough of Cheshire East
Educational institutions established in 2011
2011 establishments in England
Secondary schools in the Borough of Cheshire East